Ilyes Sidhoum (born August 10, 1989 in Nedroma) is an Algerian football player who plays as a midfielder for Olympique de Médéa in the Algerian Ligue Professionnelle 1.

Club career
In 2020, he signed a contract with NA Hussein Dey.

International career
On December 22, 2009, Sidhoum was called up by Abdelhak Benchikha to the Algerian Under-23 National Team for a week-long training camp in Algiers. In May 2010, he was called up again for a training camp in Italy.

Honours
 Won the World Military Cup once with the Algerian National Military Team in 2011

References

External links
 DZFoot Profile
 

1989 births
Living people
People from Nedroma
Algerian footballers
Algerian Ligue Professionnelle 1 players
WA Tlemcen players
CR Belouizdad players
USM Bel Abbès players
Algeria under-23 international footballers
Association football midfielders
21st-century Algerian people